Casimir the Great Park is the oldest park in Bydgoszcz, Poland, covering an area of 2.24 ha. The park is located in a central part of downtown Bydgoszcz, bordered by Gdańska Street, Konarski Street, Jagiellońska street and Freedom Square. Its area represents a rectangle of 100m by 200m.

History 
Park Casimir the Great is a fragment of the much larger park of the Order of Saint Clare in Bydgoszcz dating back to the first half of the 17th century.
Sisters of Poor Clares came to Bydgoszcz in 1615, and after the construction of the monastery (now one of the city museum buildings), the adjacent garden was created and organized. It can be accessed today through an alley at 3 May Street 3: its surface is approximately 3.5 hectares.
The original garden was not only ornamental, but also practical: a fish pond, a kitchen garden, an orchard with medicinal plants were part of it.

After secularization of the order by the Prussian authorities, the garden belonged to the regional office of Bydgoszcz, which turned it into a three hectare "District Park" in 1835, forbidden to city residents. In 1861 two swans and carp were purchased for the two ponds.

In the 1900-1901, the park was renovated, and its area reduced to 2.4 ha. The work was led by Paul Meyerkamp. After completion on October 1, 1901, the park, now property of the municipal and urban park administration, was made available to the city public.

On 23 July 1904, on the northern edge of the park close to Freedom Square, the monumental foutain "The Deluge" was inaugurated. It is a work by the Berlin sculptor Ferdinand Lepcke. The masterpiece sculpture has been integrated and connected with the surrounding park in a seamless manner.

In 1938, 69 species of trees and shrubs were growing in the park, many dating back to 17th and 18th century. The largest specimens were, among others, several English oaks with trunk circonference 390 to 400 cm and 50 giant Scots elm specimens.

At this time, many species were growing in the park, including park include: elms, sessile oaks, pyramidal English oaks, ailanthi, horse-chestnuts, sugar maples, maple trees, birches, Siberian peashrubs, purple hazels, purple European beeches, Kentucky coffeetrees, grandiflora hortensias, kerrias, magnolias, American sycamores, peony bushes, black locusts, robinias, snowberry bushes, large-leaved lindens, small-leaved lindens, yews, pines, black pines, Caucasian walnuts, cypresses, London planetrees and other trees and shrubs.

During the German occupation, a lot of trees were cut down to build shelters, mainly during 1944. Generally speaking, trees of the park have been destroyed by war artillery. In January 1943 Nazis looted the fountain "The Deluge" for war purposes.

In 1946, to celebrate the 600th anniversary of Bydgoszcz an exhibition about Pomeranian Industry, Craft and Trade was held in the park and in the three schools located at Konarski Street. The exhibition, convened from 14 July to 15 September, housed 1085 exhibitors, and was visited by 120000 people during the first three weeks.
A temporary outdoor amphitheatre had been set up for the occasion. The latter was replaced by permanent one, built in 1956 in the nearby Wincenty Witos Park.

In the 1990s and the beginning of 21st century, the park Casimir the Great has undergone a restoration, culminating by the reconstruction of fountain "The Deluge" to its original shape in 2014.

Successive appellations 
Through its history, the park had been given the following names:
 1615 - 1835, Garden of Poor Clare sisters
 1835 - 1901, Regency Park
 1901 - 1920, Municipal Park
 1920 - 1939, Park Casimir the Great
 1939 - 1945, Park Victoria
 Since 1945, Park Casimir the Great.
Patron of the park is king Casimir the Great (1309-1370) who gave civic rights to Bydgoszcz city and ordered the building of the Castle of Bydgoszcz in 1346.

Rare trees 
The park features the following rare tree species: 
 cypresses, 
 conical oaks, 
 London planetrees.
In the park Casimir the Great seven specimens are identified as Polish Natural Monuments, and twelve others are located in the close vicinity.

Polish Natural Monuments in the park Casimir the Great and its surroundings

Gallery

See also  

 Bydgoszcz
 Freedom Square in Bydgoszcz
 Gdańska Street, Bydgoszcz
 St Peter's and St Paul's Church, Bydgoszcz
 Freedom Monument, Bydgoszcz
 Tenement at Freedom Square 1, Bydgoszcz
  Parks and green areas in Bydgoszcz
  Nature conservation in Bydsgoszcz

References

Bibliography 
 
 
 
 

Parks in Bydgoszcz
Casimir III the Great